Son Seong-cheol (born February 14, 1987) is a South Korean springboard diver. He won a bronze medal, along with his partner Park Ji-Ho, for the men's synchronized springboard at the 2010 Asian Games in Guangzhou, China, accumulating a score of 388.26 points.

Son represented South Korea at the 2008 Summer Olympics in Beijing, where he competed as the nation's lone diver for the men's springboard event. He placed last out of twenty-nine divers in the preliminary round by seven points behind Italy's Tommaso Marconi, with a total score of 353.35 after six successive attempts.

References

External links
NBC 2008 Olympics profile

South Korean male divers
Living people
Olympic divers of South Korea
Divers at the 2008 Summer Olympics
Asian Games medalists in diving
1987 births
Divers at the 2010 Asian Games
Asian Games bronze medalists for South Korea
Medalists at the 2010 Asian Games
21st-century South Korean people